Kevin Schawinski (April 28, 1981 in Zürich) is a Swiss astrophysicist. He was a professor at ETH Zurich (the Swiss Federal Institute of Technology) in Zürich.

Early life 
Kevin Schawinski grew up in both Switzerland and Germany. His father is Swiss media entrepreneur Roger Schawinski.

Education 
Kevin Schawinski graduated from Cornell University in the United States in 2004 with degrees in both physics and mathematics. Following that, he went to the University of Oxford, where he was a fellow at Christ Church College and later the "Henry Skynner Junior Research Fellow" at Balliol College. He was awarded the Royal Astronomical Society's 2008 Michael Penston Prize for his doctoral thesis "The Star Formation History of Early-type Galaxies". He received his D.Phil. in 2008.

While a graduate student at Oxford, Schawinski founded the citizen science project Galaxy Zoo along with researcher Chris Lintott, which later became the Zooniverse.

Career
From 2008 to 2012, Schawinski was a postdoctoral research associate at Yale University and in 2009 became a NASA Einstein Fellow.  His research at Yale included studies of black holes, galaxy formation, and co-founding the citizen science project Planet Hunters.

In 2012, he became a professor in the Institute for Astronomy at ETH Zürich in Switzerland. He is the secretary of the Swiss Society of Astrophysics and Astronomy, the professional society of astronomers in Switzerland. The Gottlieb Duttweiler Institute named him one of the "Thought Leaders" of Switzerland in 2016. In 2017, he was awarded the European Astronomical Society's MERAC Prize as the best junior researcher in observational astrophysics. In 2017, he launched the Space.ml platform with Ce Zhang to apply artificial intelligence to astrophysics research.

Together with colleagues from ETH Zurich and the University of Zurich, he founded the Citizen Science Center Zurich.

Schawinski is the CEO of Modulos AI, a company which is dedicated to bringing Artificial Intelligence to the "right level of abstraction""

In 2020, Schawniski discussed the future of Modulos with Guy Spier

Research 
Schawinski has worked on a range of topics from galaxy evolution, black hole astrophysics, citizen science and artificial intelligence. He has published over 200 peer reviewed articles, including 6 in Nature and Science. His publications have been cited over 16,000 times.

See also
 Zooniverse
 Hanny's Voorwerp
 Pea galaxy
 Reinventing Discovery

References

External links
CBC Radio Interview An interview of K. Schawinski on CBC radio.

Swiss astrophysicists
Cornell University alumni
Academic staff of ETH Zurich
Scientists from Zürich
1981 births
Living people